The 1999 Bob Jane T-Marts Super Touring 500 was a motor race staged at the Mount Panorama Circuit, Bathurst, New South Wales, Australia on 3 October 1999. It was the 37th and last in a sequence of annual touring car endurance races to be organised by the Australian Racing Driver's Club at the Mount Panorama Circuit, previous events having included Bathurst 500 races and, from 1973, the Bathurst 1000.

The race was open to Super Touring cars, with FIA Production cars, GT Production cars and Schedule S cars also invited to compete. Qualifying established the grid for a 100 kilometre preliminary race, the Bob Jane T-Marts Super Touring 100, which in turn determined grid positions for the 500 kilometre main event.

The Super Touring 500 was won by Paul Morris driving a BMW 320i.

Race

The race was very heavily weather affected with rain wreathing the circuit for much of the day, earlier blighting the Bob Jane T-Marts V8 300 race held for a combined field of AUSCARs and Future Touring Cars. The race spent many laps behind a safety car because of heavy rain and poor visibility caused by fog across the top of the Mountain, including the final 17 laps and was eventually declared after 50 laps, 31 short of the intended full race distance. Paul Morris avenged his disqualification from victory in the 1997 AMP Bathurst 1000 taking victory over the two-car factory supported Volvo team, Jim Richards driving solo as Cameron McLean was unable to take his scheduled middle stint because of the weather and because of tyre issues, and Craig Baird and Matthew Coleman. Fourth place and leading independent driver was young New Zealander Mark Porter who had impressed team owner Mike Downard that he kept Porter in the car rather than take his own turn at the wheel. Leading independent team Knight Racing saw the Dean Canto / Leanne Ferrier buried in a sand trap at The Chase while the lead car of Peter Hills / Ron Searle struggled with water leaks and electrical issues.

Official results

Bob Jane T-Marts Super Touring 100

Bob Jane T-Marts Super Touring 500

Note:
 Italics indicate the driver practiced the car but did not compete in the race.
 The Rod Salmon / Damien White Mitsubishi Lancer Evo V was entered as a GT Production car.

Statistics
 Pole Position – #3 Jim Richards (Determined from results of 100 km race)
 Fastest Lap – #3 Jim Richards – 2:38.1390
 Race time of winning car – 2:55:31.5969
 Average Race Speed – 106 km/h

References

Motorsport in Bathurst, New South Wales
Bob Jane T-Marts Super Touring 500